Justin Joseph Doellman (born 3 February 1985) is an American-born naturalized Kosovan former professional basketball player who last played for Baxi Manresa of the Liga ACB.

College career
Doellman played four years of Division I college basketball at Xavier University, playing with the Xavier Musketeers. He averaged 10.6 points and 5.4 rebounds per game in the NCAA.

Professional career

Doellman started his pro career in France, where he spent three years in the LNB Pro A.

In 2010, he signed with Liga ACB squad Meridiano Alicante, where he averaged 13.1 points and 6.2 rebounds in the Spanish League, and in the next summer, he played for Assignia Manresa, where he became the second top scorer of the Spanish league, with 16.8 points per game. He was also voted the Spanish League's MVP of the Month for the month of January.

In 2012, and after a great season, Doellman left Manresa to join Valencia, where he signed for the next two seasons. He was named to the All-EuroCup First Team in 2013 and 2014. With Valencia, he won the 2013–14 season of the EuroCup, and he was named the EuroCup Finals MVP. He was also named the ACB Most Valuable Player of the 2013–14 ACB season. On 1 July 2014, Valencia announced that Doellman decided not to extend his contract with Valencia.

On 9 July 2014, Doellman signed a two-year contract with Barcelona. On 28 July 2016, he re-signed with Barcelona for three more seasons. On 16 June 2017, Barcelona parted ways with Doellman.

On 11 October 2017, Doellman signed with Turkish club Anadolu Efes for the 2017–18 season. In November 2017, he parted ways with Efes. On 16 January 2018, he signed with Montenegrin club Budućnost for the rest of the season.

On 19 July 2018, Doellman signed a one-year deal with Baxi Manresa of the Liga ACB.

Kosovan national team
Doellman took Kosovan citizenship, and agreed to play with the senior men's Kosovan national basketball team, at the EuroBasket 2017's qualification tournament.

Career statistics

EuroLeague

|-
| style="text-align:left;"| 2009–10
| style="text-align:left;"| Orléans
| 9 || 4 || 22.8 || .475 || .289 || .833 || 4.3 || .7 || 1.8 || .4 || 12.4 || 12.8
|-
| style="text-align:left;"| 2014–15
| style="text-align:left;" rowspan=3| Barcelona
| 26 || 23 || 24.2 || .428 || .355 || .889 || 4.3 || 1.2 || .8 || .2 || 9.8 || 10.5
|-
| style="text-align:left;"| 2015–16
| 28 || 25 || 24.2 || .483 || .429 || .878 || 4.0 || .9 || 1.2 || .1 || 9.6 || 10.5
|-
| style="text-align:left;"| 2016–17
| 15 || 14 || 20.0 || .409 || .536 || .947 || 3.1 || 1.2 || .9 || .1 || 7.8 || 8.4
|- class="sortbottom"
| style="text-align:left;"| Career
| style="text-align:left;"|
| 63 || 52 || 24.0 || .459 || .368 || .873 || 4.2 || 1.0 || 1.1 || .2 || 10.1 || 10.8

Domestic leagues

Trophies and achievements

Trophies
Cholet:
French Leaders Cup: (2008)
 Valencia:
EuroCup: (2014)
Budućnost:
Montenegrin Cup (2018)
ABA League champion (2018)

Achievements
Xavier:
 Blackburn/McCafferty Trophy: (2007)
Assignia Manresa:
 Spanish ACB League Player of the Month: (January 2012)
Valencia:
 Spanish ACB League Player of the Month: (May 2013)
 2× All-EuroCup First Team: (2013, 2014)
 EuroCup Finals MVP: (2014)
 All-Spanish League Team: (2014)
 Spanish ACB League MVP: (2014)

References

External links

 Justin Doellman at acb.com 
 Justin Doellman at fiba.com
 Justin Doellman at euroleague.net
 Justin Doellman at goxavier.com
 

1985 births
Living people
American emigrants to Kosovo
American expatriate basketball people in France
American expatriate basketball people in Montenegro
American expatriate basketball people in Spain
American expatriate basketball people in Turkey
American men's basketball players
Anadolu Efes S.K. players
Basketball players from Kentucky
Basketball players from Cincinnati
Bàsquet Manresa players
Besançon BCD players
CB Lucentum Alicante players
Cholet Basket players
FC Barcelona Bàsquet players
KK Budućnost players
Kosovan men's basketball players
Liga ACB players
People with acquired Kosovan citizenship
Kosovan expatriate basketball people in France
Kosovan expatriate basketball people in Spain 
Kosovan expatriate basketball people in Turkey
Naturalised citizens of Kosovo
Orléans Loiret Basket players
People from Boone County, Kentucky
Power forwards (basketball)
Ryle High School alumni
Small forwards
Valencia Basket players
Xavier Musketeers men's basketball players